Attinguié is a village in southern Ivory Coast. It is in the Anyama sub-prefecture in the Autonomous District of Abidjan. Prior to 2011, it was in the Abidjan Department, Lagunes Region.

Attinguié was a commune until March 2012, when it became one of 1126 communes nationwide that were abolished.

Notes

Former communes of Ivory Coast
Populated places in Abidjan